Unnai Thedi Varuven is a 1985 Indian Tamil-language thriller film directed by C. V. Sridhar and produced by K. R. Gangadharan. The film stars Suresh, Nalini, Sadhana and Vinoth. It was released on 5 July 1985, and became a commercial success.

Plot 

Devi and Anitha are best friends that are in Anitha's home alone when a killer on the run (Vinoth) enters their home. He's running from the police after killing his ex-girlfriend and plans on hiding out at the house. The young women capture him and he's arrested but nurses a grudge against the two. Anitha is rich and funds Devi's education. Devi lives with her brother (Ravi) and sister-in-law. As her education is funded by Anitha, Devi feels a sense of obligation towards her friend. The two run into Anand (Suresh), a happy-go-lucky dancer and Anitha falls for him. Anand, however, loves Devi and she reciprocates. Anand and Devi marry just as Vinoth escapes prison intent on getting revenge on the two women. Anitha and Devi must somehow escape Vinoth's clutches.

Cast 
 Suresh as Anand
 Nalini as Devi
 Sadhana as Anitha
 Vinoth
 J. Lalitha
 Disco Shanti
 Thengai Srinivasan as Venkatachalam
 Manorama as Sundari
 Nizhalgal Ravi

Production 
Unnai Thedi Varuven was produced by K. R. Gangadharan under KRG Film Circuit and directed by C. V. Sridhar, who also wrote the story. The comedy subplot featuring Thengai Srinivasan and Manorama was written by Sridhar's longtime associate Chitralaya Gopu. Cinematography was handled by P. Bhaskar Rao, and the editing by K. R. Ramalingam.

Soundtrack 
The soundtrack was composed by Ilaiyaraaja.

Release and reception 
Unnai Thedi Varuven was released on 5 July 1985. Jayamanmadhan of Kalki said the suspense element in the film was weak, and was like sambar and payasam mixed together. The film became a commercial success.

References

External links 
 

1980s Tamil-language films
1985 thriller films
Films directed by C. V. Sridhar
Films scored by Ilaiyaraaja
Films with screenplays by C. V. Sridhar
Indian thriller films